Botusfleming or Botus Fleming is a village and civil parish in southeast Cornwall, England, United Kingdom. The 2001 census gives the parish population as 783,which decreased to 771 at the 2011 census. There is a public house (the Rising Sun), a market garden and a small colony of artists, but the village is mostly a dormitory area for Plymouth.

Parish church
The parish church is dedicated to St Mary and has a western tower and a fine arcade between the nave and the north aisle. The church was restored in 1872 by Henry Eliott; this restoration included new roofs, floors, pews and glazing. The font is of Polyphant stone, probably 14th century in date. In a field near the church is an obelisk in memory of William Martyn built in 1762.

In the church is a stone effigy of a knight in armour; he is thought to be Stephen le Fleming who was a medieval Crusader and perhaps left his name to the place.

Other buildings
 Moditonham House is the site of the medieval castle of the Moditons and is now a large Georgian house which is a grade two* listed building incorporating fabric from the earlier building. Michael Loam, a Cornish engineer who introduced the first man engine (a device to carry men up and down the shaft of a mine) into the UK died here. 
 The Bidwell is a 20th-century restored 14th century constructed well (with a roof) on a main street in the village, with a 19th-century statue of Saint Mary (mother of Jesus).
 The Rising Sun pub was voted number 5 in Britain's Good Pub Guide 2009.

References

External links

Villages in Cornwall
Civil parishes in Cornwall